The 1991 West Dorset District Council election was held on Thursday 2 May 1991 to elect councillors to West Dorset District Council in England. It took place on the same day as other district council elections in the United Kingdom. The entire council was up for election. District boundary changes took place before the election but the number of seats remained the same.

The 1991 election saw the council remain in no overall control, with Independent councillors maintaining their status as the largest group.

Ward results

Beaminster

Bothenhampton

Bradford Abbas

Bradpole

Bridport North

Bridport South

Broadmayne

Broadwindsor

Burton Bradstock

Caundle Vale

Cerne Valley

Charminster

Charmouth

Chesil Bank

Chickerell

Dorchester East

Dorchester North

Dorchester South

Dorchester West

Frome Valley

Halstock

Holnest

Loders

Lyme Regis

Maiden Newton

Netherbury

Owermoigne

Piddle Valley

Puddletown

Queen Thorne

Sherborne East

Sherborne West

Symondsbury

Thorncombe

Tolpuddle

Whitchurch Canonicorum

Winterborne St Martin

Yetminster

References

West Dorset
1991
20th century in Dorset